Nová Ves is a municipality and village in Louny District in the Ústí nad Labem Region of the Czech Republic. It has about 100 inhabitants.

References

Villages in Louny District